Xiqun Hope Elementary School is a Hope Elementary School located at Longjin Village, Banqiao Township, Zhijin County, Guizhou, China. It was founded in 2003 by Grace Charity Foundation of Hong Kong and the local government.

History
In 2003 Hong Kong philanthropists Mr. and Mrs. Mak donated ¥60,000 to Grace Charity Foundation. With another ¥60,000 of matching fund from the local government, a school was established. Construction finished in 2004. Initially there were 4 grades and 2 teachers. However, due to the lack of teachers, Grade 3 and 4 were soon abolished and students transferred to nearby schools. At the beginning of 2008, a volunteer teacher named Ning Han from Shanxi came to the school. Together with Mr. and Mrs. Chi Yong from Shenyang they steadily built the school up. In September 2008, the school has again had four grades, with facilities including a basketball court, a wall and a computer room, most of which were funded by donations.

In August 2009, another volunteer, He Guanghui, from Nanchang University joined the school.

Campus
The school is located by a country highway, about 15 minutes by bus from Banqiao Township, and 50 minutes to Zhijin County. The school building is 2-story high, with 6 classrooms and 2 offices. A basketball court, doubling as a playground were built over the summer of 2008, thanks to the donation by philanthropists Li Guang and Xue Yungong, and a matching grant by the township government.

Staff and students
In April 2010, there are 80 students, two local teachers and one volunteer teacher in the school.

Influence
It is the first Hope Elementary School in China to have its own website.
It is the only elementary school in Banqiao Township to have school uniforms.

References

External links
School website (Simplified Chinese) Closed due to web registration issues
Mr. Chi Yong's blog (Simplified Chinese)

Schools in China
Primary schools in China
Education in Guizhou